The 2004 Sunderland City Council election took place on 10 June 2004 to elect members of Sunderland City Council Council in Tyne and Wear, England. The whole council was up for election following boundary changes since the last election in 2003. The Labour Party stayed in overall control of the council.

Campaign
Every seat was contested in the election for the first time since 1982. Labour held a big majority before the election with 63 seats, but almost a quarter of Labour's councillors stood down at the election. Labour was the only party to field a full 75 candidates, while the next largest number of candidates was from the Conservative party who fielded 54 candidates. Candidates in the election also included 25 from the British National Party after the party failed to win any seats in the 2003 election but came second in 6 wards.

Labour described their record in control of the council as being positive and that they were making progress, but the Conservatives described Labour as being "arrogant and remote". The Conservatives targeted wards in the town of Washington as well as Millfield, St Chad's and St Peters, while Barnes ward was seen as being a three-way battle between Labour, Conservatives and Liberal Democrats.

At the election count anti-Nazi demonstrators had a scuffle with British National Party supporters when the candidates entered the building, with one British National Party candidate being arrested on suspicion of assault.

Election result
The results saw Labour hold control of the council with a large majority, but the Conservatives made some gains in Barnes, Fulwell and St Michael's. This meant Labour ended with 61 seats, while the Conservatives were up three on 12 seats. The Liberal Democrats took two seats, while the British National Party failed to win any seats. Overall turnout was 40.26%, down on the 47.47% in 2003 but up on the 22% at the 2002 election before all postal voting was used.

This resulted in the following composition of the council:

Ward by ward results

References

2004 English local elections
2004
21st century in Tyne and Wear